Bruno Ghedina (21 February 1943 – 10 January 2021) was an Italian ice hockey player.

Life
He competed at the 1964 Winter Olympics. With the SG Cortina, Ghedina won 8 times the scudetto.

Ghedina died from COVID-19 on 10 January 2021, age 77, during the COVID-19 pandemic in Italy. His wife had also died from the disease a day earlier.

References

1943 births
2021 deaths
Italian ice hockey players
Olympic ice hockey players of Italy
Ice hockey players at the 1964 Winter Olympics
SG Cortina players
Deaths from the COVID-19 pandemic in Veneto
People from Cortina d'Ampezzo
Sportspeople from the Province of Belluno